Alessandro "Sandro" Mazzinghi (3 October 1938 – 22 August 2020) was an Italian professional boxer who held the world light middleweight championship twice.

Biography 
In 1961 Mazzinghi won the Military World Championships. The same year he turned professional, following his elder brother Guido. He eventually became a European and World Champion, and had a record of 64–3–0–2 (42 KOs). Of these matches, five were valid for the European title and 8 for the World title. On 7 September 1963 he won the world light middleweight title, defeating the American Ralph Dupas by a ninth-round technical knockout in Milan. In December of the same year, a rematch took place in Sydney, Australia, and Mazzinghi won again by knockout.

He remained world champion until 1965, a year in which he suffered a terrible accident. The boxer remained in critical condition for some days, with a skull fracture that would condition his career in the following years. Mazzinghi came back in the ring to defend his title in Genoa, Italy, against Tony Montano (knockout in the 12th round) and in Rome, against Fortunato Manca (winning by decision in 15 rounds).

On 18 June 1965 Mazzinghi faced Nino Benvenuti and lost by knockout in the sixth round, losing his world title. In their rematch, Mazzinghi barely escaped an early round knockout when he was floored – unable to rise in time he was saved by the bell. He rebounded from that close call to give Benvenuti a hard fight, but Benvenuti won by decision.

Mazzinghi started again and gained the Superwelter European crown in Rome, Italy, on 17 June 1966 defeating Yoland Leveque; he defended his title four times.

On 26 May 1968, Mazzinghi beat Korean Ki-Soo Kim in "San Siro" Stadium, Milan, Italy, regaining the world light middleweight crown.

On 25 October he fought against American Freddie Little, but was disqualified by the referee for an illegal blow; this decision was revoked and the result of the match was changed to a "no contest". A few days later, the Italian Boxing Federation took away the title from Mazzinghi, after the WBA wouldn't.

In 1970 he left boxing for seven years, and would make a comeback from 1977 to 1978. He retired in 1978.

Professional boxing record

See also
 Legends of Italian sport - Walk of Fame
List of world light-middleweight boxing champions

References

External links 

 
Alessandro Mazzinghi - CBZ Profile

1938 births
2020 deaths
People from Pontedera
Italian male boxers
European Boxing Union champions
World Boxing Association champions
World Boxing Council champions
Light-middleweight boxers
World light-middleweight boxing champions
Sportspeople from the Province of Pisa